The Triumph Tiger Sport 660 is a middle-weight Sport touring motorcycle launched in 2022 by British manufacturer Triumph Motorcycles Ltd and using many of the components of its naked sibling, the Triumph Trident 660.

Features 
The motorcycle features:
 Riding modes (rain/road)
 Switchable traction control
 Non-switchable anti-lock brakes
 Hybrid LCD/TFT instrument pod
 Full LED lighting
 Remote preload adjustment for the rear shocks
 Optional quickshifter and autoblipper
 A2 Licence restrictor kit
 LAMS Restricted (39 kW) model for Australia / New Zealand market
 Adjustable windshield
An optional Bluetooth connectivity system is available, which allows mobile phone connection, navigation, music control, and GoPro control. This system is driven by the My Triumph app, and available for both Android and Apple iOS.

References

External links 
 Triumph Tiger Sport 660

Triumph Tiger Sport 660